Geoffrey Wren (died 5 April 1527) was a Canon of Windsor from 1514 to 1527

Career

He was appointed:
Vicar of Brantingham 1486 - 1496
Rector of St John the Evangelist's Church, Carlton in Lindrick 1501
Rector of Boldon
Master of Sherburn Hospital
Rector of All Saints Church, Loughborough 1509 - 1527
Rector of St Margaret, New Fish Street
Prebendary of York 1508
Prebendary of Howden 1510
Prebendary of Corborough in Lichfield 1512
Clerk of the Closet 1510

He was appointed to the eighth stall in St George's Chapel, Windsor Castle in 1514 and held the canonry until 1527.

Notes 

1527 deaths
Canons of Windsor
Year of birth unknown